Ligilactobacillus animalis is a non-motile, homofermentative species in the Gram-positive genus Ligilactobacillus, initially isolated from the dental plaque of primates. L. animalis has optimal growth at 37°C on MRS agar, making this species mesophilic. This species can ferment cellobiose, fructose, glucose, lactose, maltose, melibiose, raffinose, and salicin, but it cannot ferment xylose. The genome size of the type strain is 1.89 Mbp and the G/C content is 41.1%.

References 

Lactobacillaceae
Bacteria described in 1983